Christophe Agnolutto (born 6 December 1969, Soisy-sous-Montmorency, Val-d'Oise) is a professional road bicycle racer from France.

Agnolutto was a commercial artist when, as an amateur in 1995, he won Bordeaux-Saintes and the GP Nord-Pas de Calais and came third in the national championship. He rode successively for the CSM Puteaux, the US Créteil and the ASPPT Paris. He dedicated himself to cycling when he met his wife, Mélanie, when he was 23. He turned professional the following year for Petit Casino, sponsored by a supermarket chain. He stayed with the team and its directeur sportif, Vincent Lavenu, through changes of sponsors. He said: "I didn't exactly have a lot of other offers."

Then he left for Agritubel. He said:

Agnolutto won the 1997 Tour de Suisse after breaking clear on the second stage. The favourites didn't take up the chase and couldn't make up Agnolutto's lead afterwards. He said in 2001:

That win was stage seven of the 2000 Tour de France, taken in an early breakaway. It was France's first win in the Tour for two years, since Jacky Durand in 1998. He told his team-mates that morning what he planned to do and attacked three times at the start of the stage. On the third attempt he cleared the front of the race alone. He rode alone in the rain for 80 km of the 127 km from Tours to Limoges, getting up to 8m 20s lead.

Agnolutto rode the Tour five times and won nine races as a professional before retiring at the end of 2006.

Retirement
Agnulotto lives in Pau and coaches the UN Pau Béarn. He studied for a Brevet d'État to open a school of sport and business and organises training camps for cyclists. He runs a cycle shop at Salies-de-Béarn and helps organise a bike ride named after him.

Tour de France 
 1997 - 94th
 1998 - 31st
 2000 - 66th, winner 7th stage
 2001 - 120th
 2002 - 144th

Major results

1996 – Petit Casino
First year as a professional 
1997 – Casino
 Overall and Stage 2 – Tour de Suisse (2.1)
 A Travers le Morbihan (1.2)
 97th overall – Tour de France
1998 – Casino
 Stage 6 – Tour de Romandie (2.HC)
 31st overall – Tour de France
1999 – Casino
 King of the Mountains – Tour de Luxembourg (2.2)
2000 – Ag2r Prévoyance
 Stage 7 win and 66th overall – Tour de France (2.HC)
2001 – Ag2r Decathlon
 120th overall – Tour de France
2002 – Ag2r Prévoyance
 144th overall – Tour de France
2003 – Ag2r Prévoyance
2004 – Ag2r Prévoyance
 3rd overall – Tour de Wallonie (2.3)
2005 – Agritubel
 Stage 1 – Tour du Poitou Charentes de la Vienne (2.1)
2006 – Agritubel
Retired at end of season

References

External links 

Official Tour de France results for Christophe Agnolutto

1969 births
Living people
People from Soisy-sous-Montmorency
French male cyclists
French Tour de France stage winners
Tour de Suisse stage winners
Sportspeople from Val-d'Oise
Cyclists from Île-de-France